Dharma Raj Kanniah (born 16 November 1969) is a Malaysian field hockey player. He competed in the men's tournament at the 1992 Summer Olympics.

References

External links
 

1969 births
Living people
Malaysian people of Tamil descent
Malaysian sportspeople of Indian descent
Malaysian male field hockey players
Olympic field hockey players of Malaysia
Field hockey players at the 1992 Summer Olympics
Place of birth missing (living people)